The Averroes International School is recognized by the Ministry of Education (Bangladesh) and authorized by British Council and Pearson Edexcel as an English medium educational institution for both primary and secondary sections.

The school was established in 2015. The main buildings are located in Lalmatia, with branches in Uttara and Mirpur.

The school offers English medium education to students from play group to A Level, leading to the International GCSE O Level and International A Level examinations, held under the Edexcel Board.

The school is operated by the Head of School Mohammad Anisur Rahaman, who has been a local working partner of British Council Bangladesh since 2007. It has over 2000 students, and 150 teaching staff.

Cultural activities
Every year school celebrates the National Days to pay tribute to the National Heroes. The school holds events to pay tribute to the Freedom Fighters of Liberation War of Bangladesh. School organises month long activities in the month of Victory. Independence Day & International Mother Language Day are also celebrated with the participation of huge number of students through different types of events.

References

Schools in Dhaka
2015 establishments in Bangladesh
Educational institutions established in 2015
Islam in Dhaka
International schools in Bangladesh